Brian William Mansfield (born 8 November 1948) was a rugby union player who represented Australia.

Mansfield, a lock, was born in Moree, New South Wales and claimed 1 international rugby cap for Australia.

References

Australian rugby union players
Australia international rugby union players
1948 births
Living people
Rugby union players from New South Wales
Rugby union locks